George Ryoichi Ariyoshi (born March 12, 1926) is an American lawyer and politician who served as the third governor of Hawaii from 1974 to 1986. A Democrat, he is Hawaii's longest-serving governor and the first American of Asian descent to serve as governor of a U.S. state. He assumed gubernatorial powers and duties when Governor John A. Burns was declared incapacitated in October 1973 and was elected in 1974 (assuming governorship December 1974), becoming the first Asian-American to be elected governor of a U.S. state or territory. His lengthy tenure is a record likely to remain unbroken due to term limits enacted after he left office. Ariyoshi is now considered an elder statesman of the Democratic Party of Hawaii.

Early life
Ariyoshi was born in Honolulu, then in the Territory of Hawaii, to Japanese immigrant parents, who named him after George Washington. Ariyoshi graduated in 1944 from McKinley High School. As World War II drew to a close, he served as an interpreter with the U.S. Army Military Intelligence Service in Japan. Upon returning stateside, he first attended the University of Hawaiʻi at Mānoa, then transferred to Michigan State University, where he graduated with a Bachelor of Arts degree in 1949. He then went on to receive his J.D. degree from the University of Michigan Law School in 1952.

Political career
Ariyoshi's political career began in 1954 when he was elected to the Hawaii Territorial House of Representatives. He was later elected to the Hawaii Territorial Senate in 1958, then to the Hawaii State Senate in 1959. He served in the senate until 1970 when he ran for and was elected lieutenant governor of Hawaii in 1970 with Governor John A. Burns. When Governor Burns fell ill in October 1973, Ariyoshi assumed his constitutional role as acting governor.

Governor
In the election of 1974, Ariyoshi was elected governor in his own right, with Nelson Doi as his lieutenant governor. He was re-elected in 1978 with Jean King as lieutenant governor and in 1982 with John D. Waihee III as lieutenant governor. Ariyoshi's administration was marked by fiscal conservatism as the post-statehood economic boom came to an end. He guided the state through its first economic recession. Barred by term limits from seeking another term in 1986, Ariyoshi was succeeded by Waihee. After leaving public office, he served in a variety of corporate and non-profit capacities.

Personal life

Ariyoshi married Jean Miya Hayashi in 1955 in Honolulu, Hawaii. They have a daughter, Lynn, born in 1957; and two sons, Ryozo, born in 1959, and Donn, 1961.

In her book Washington Place: A First Lady's Story, Jean Ariyoshi credits former police officer Larry Mehau as becoming responsible for her family's safety. Mehau was also named "Neighbor Islands Coordinator" for her husband's campaign for governor. In the book she states that Mehau, although having a reputation as being honest and tough, was nicknamed in the press as "the Godfather". She does not mention why he was given this nickname, but the press did so because he was accused of having ties to the criminal underworld, many claiming that he was the top boss of organized crime in Hawai'i. According to Jean Ariyoshi, Mehau offered his help but told her husband: "I know I'm controversial, so don't put me up in front."  Her husband responded: "I've known you for a long time and I've known you to be a good and honest person. What kind of friend would I be if I said 'I want your help but I don't want anyone to know you're helping me?' I'm not afraid to have people know of our friendship." In his own 200-page autobiography, With Obligation to All, George Ariyoshi does not mention Larry Mehau at all.

Ariyoshi has also served as president of the Hawaii Bar Association and served on the board of directors for First Hawaiian Bank, the Honolulu Gas Company and Hawaiian Insurance Guaranty Company. He also served on the board of governors at the East-West Center, based in Honolulu, an internationally known education and research organization that was established by U.S. Congress. As governor, he is credited with revitalizing the organization, and joined the board when his term as governor ended. He served five terms as chairman, until he was not reappointed by Republican Governor Linda Lingle in 2003.

He is the oldest living former governor of Hawaii.

See also 
 List of minority governors and lieutenant governors in the United States

References

Ariyoshi, Wife Detained in Dispute with Customs" (Honolulu Advertiser 05-28-87)
(resigned from FHB to spare them "any embarrassment")(Honolulu Advertiser 06-19-87)
(pays $11,389.00 fine)(Honolulu Advertiser 11-28-87)
https://books.google.com/books/about/Land_and_Power_in_Hawaii.html?id=8128CdCEJNcC

External links

 My Philosophy Vol.85 George Ariyoshi (2018)
Honolulu Star Bulletin Article about Ariyoshi's Wife and her book, Washington Place: A First Lady's Story
Honolulu Star Bulletin Editorial Column
The Hawaii Connection
Donn Ariyoshi
George Ariyoshi Tribute Site
Portrait of Ariyoshi by Margaret Holland Sargent
Appearances on C-SPAN

|-

|-

|-

1926 births
20th-century American politicians
United States Army personnel of World War II
American politicians of Japanese descent
American state governors of Japanese descent
Democratic Party governors of Hawaii
Hawaii lawyers
Hawaii politicians of Japanese descent
Democratic Party Hawaii state senators
Lieutenant Governors of Hawaii
Living people
Members of the Hawaii Territorial Legislature
Michigan State University alumni
Military personnel from Hawaii
Politicians from Honolulu
United States Army soldiers
University of Michigan Law School alumni